'Hollywood Heights is a Nick at Nite television drama series, that later moved to TeenNick. The show follows "the journey of a teenage girl whose life changes drastically when she becomes a star and wins the love of her rock and roll star and both are tested by setbacks, heartbreak and deception." Following the Latin American telenovela format, Hollywood Heights aired every weeknight at 9 p.m. rather than airing weekly. It aired 80 episodes over a single season.

Episodes

References

External links
 
 List of Hollywood Heights episodes'' at TheFutonCitic.com

Lists of American drama television series episodes